(S)-Ipsdienol is a terpene alcohol. It is one of the major aggregation pheromones of the bark beetle. It was first identified from Ips confusus, in which it is believed to be a principle sex attractant. 
It is suggested that the compound plays a role in interspecies communication between Ips latidens and Ips ini, facilitating reductions in competition for breeding material and/or mating interference.

Synthesis 
The compound has been synthesized from D-mannitol. Alternative syntheses were realized through the asymmetric isoprenylation of correspondent aldehyde (prenal) and alcohol (prenol).
Chiral resolution of racemic precursor has been found to provide both enantiomers of ipsdienol in high enantiomeric purity and in preparative scale.

References 

Monoterpenes
Insect pheromones
Secondary alcohols